Vremena goda (Времена года) is Russian for "seasons of the year." It may refer to:

The Seasons (ballet), an 1899 ballet by Marius Petipa
Seasons of the Year, a 1975 film by Artavazd Peleshyan